Leon Botha (4 June 1985 – 5 June 2011) was a South African painter and disk jockey. He was known for his close association with the hip hop group Die Antwoord, as well as for being one of the world's longest-lived persons with progeria.

Biography
Botha was born in Cape Town, South Africa, and lived there until his death. He was diagnosed with progeria around the age of 4 years. He had no formal training in art beyond high school courses at the Tygerberg Art Centre, but became a full-time painter after graduation, doing commissioned works.

In 2005, Botha successfully underwent heart bypass surgery to prevent a heart attack due to progeria-related atherosclerosis.

In January 2007, Botha had his first solo art exhibition, entitled "Liquid Sword; I am HipHop", revolving around hip-hop culture as a way of life. It took place at the Rust-en-Vrede (which translates to Rest and Peace) gallery in Durbanville and was opened by Mr Fat of the South African hip hop group Brasse Vannie Kaap. His second solo exhibition opened in March 2009 and featured pieces of the artist's life. Botha was asked if the title "Liquid Swords; Slices of Lemon" referred to the adage "If life gives you lemons, make lemonade." Botha said no, adding, "Lemons? I slice 'em and serve 'em back!"

In January 2010 he hosted the first exhibit of Who Am I? Transgressions, a photo collaboration with Gordon Clark, at the João Ferreira Gallery in Cape Town. Botha said of the exhibition, "I am a spiritual being, the same as you, primarily. Then I'm a human being and this part of the human being is the body, which has a condition."

Botha was also engaged in deejaying and turntablism under the name DJ Solarize. He was featured alongside Watkin Tudor Jones, aka Ninja, in the music video "Enter the Ninja" from Die Antwoord.

In November 2010, Botha suffered a stroke. Botha died from complications of progeria in Cape Town one day after his 26th birthday.

Botha was the inspiration for the one-act opera Solarize, by Marcin Stańczyk, libretto by Andrzej Szpindler, which debuted in Warsaw in April 2014 at Teatr Wielki, the Polish National Opera.

References

External links 
Leon Botha's profile from africanhiphop.com, at archive.org

1985 births
2011 deaths
Cape Town culture
Afrikaner people
Musicians from Cape Town
South African DJs
South African male painters
People with progeria
Deaths from genetic disorders